A list of radio stations in Iran

Islamic Republic of Iran Broadcasting (IRIB) Domestic Stations 
IRIB Radio Iran (National Radio) 
IRIB Radio Farhang (Culture)
IRIB Radio Payam (Info & Entertainment)
IRIB Radio Quran (Holy Quran)
IRIB Radio Maaref (Education)
IRIB Radio Javan (Youth)
IRIB Radio Varzesh (Sports)
IRIB Radio Salamat (Health)
IRIB Radio Eghtesad (Economy & Business)
IRIB Radio Namayesh (Arts)
IRIB Radio Ava (Music)
IRIB Radio Goftogoo (Interviews)
IRIB Radio Saba
IRIB Radio Talavat
IRIB Radio Monasebati
IRIB Radio Ziarat

IRIB Foreign Stations 
 IRIB World Service (Broadcast in many languages)

IRIB Provincial Stations 
 IRIB Radio Abadan (Khuzestan Province)
 IRIB Radio Arak (Markazi Province)
 IRIB Radio Ardabil (Ardabil Province)
 IRIB Radio Alborz (Alborz Province)
 IRIB Radio Ahvaz (Khuzestan Province)
 IRIB Radio Bandar Abbas (Hormozgan Province)
 IRIB Radio Birjand (South Khorasan Province)
 IRIB Radio Borujerd (Lorestan Province)
 IRIB Radio Bushehr (Bushehr Province)
 IRIB Radio Bojnord (North Khorasan Province)
 IRIB Radio Dezful (Khuzestan Province)
 IRIB Radio Gorgan (Golestan Province) 
 IRIB Radio Gilan (Gilan Province)
 IRIB Radio Hamadan (Hamadan Province)
 IRIB Radio Isfahan (Isfahan Province)
 IRIB Radio Ilam (Ilam Province)
 IRIB Radio Kerman (Kerman Province)
 IRIB Radio Kermanshah (Kermanshah Province)
 IRIB Radio Kish (Hormozgan Province)
 IRIB Radio Lorestan (Lorestan Province)
 IRIB Radio Mashhad (Razavi Khorasan Province)
 IRIB Radio Malayer (Hamadan Province)
 IRIB Radio Mahabad (West Azerbaijan Province)
 IRIB Radio Maragheh (East Azerbaijan Province)
 IRIB Radio Qazvin (Qazvin Province)
 IRIB Radio Qom (Qom Province)
 IRIB Radio Sanandaj (Kurdistan Province)
 IRIB Radio Sari (Mazandaran Province)
 IRIB Radio Shahr-e Kord (Chaharmahal and Bakhtiari Province)
 IRIB Radio Semnan (Semnan Province)
 IRIB Radio Shiraz (Fars Province)
 IRIB Radio Tehran (Tehran Province)
 IRIB Radio Tabriz (East Azerbaijan Province)
 IRIB Radio Urmia (West Azerbaijan Province)
 IRIB Radio Yasuj (Kohgiluyeh and Boyer-Ahmad Province)
 IRIB Radio Yazd (Yazd Province)
 IRIB Radio Zahedan (Sistan and Baluchestan Province)
 IRIB Radio Zanjan (Zanjan Province)

External links
Iran Radio Stations 
FMLIST worldwide database of FM stations
FMSCAN worldwide FM reception prediction
MWLIST worldwide database of MW and LW stations
MWSCAN worldwide MW and SW reception prediction

Communications in Iran
Iran